The Search for Hidden Particle (SHiP) is a fixed-target experiment at CERN's Super Proton Synchrotron (SPS) with the goal of searching for the interactions and measurements of the weakly interacting particles. In October 2013, the Expression of Interest letter for SHiP was submitted to the SPS Council (SPSC). Following which the Technical Proposal was submitted in April 2015, describing the experimental and detector facility. The Comprehensive Design Study was completed during  2016-19.

SHiP Collaboration intends to search for the weakly interacting particles whose masses are below the Fermi energy scale. Such particles cannot be detected at Large Hadron Collider yet, though the High Luminosity LHC may open some possibilities. Alongside, the SHiP detector will also search for weakly-interacting sub-GeV dark matter particles.

SHiP also plans to add information to the domain of tau neutrino physics. Out of the three neutrino flavors, the tau neutrino is the least studied. Another goal is to study lepton flavor non-conservation, by observing the decays of the tau-leptons.

References

External links 
SHiP experiment record on INSPIRE-HEP

CERN experiments
Particle experiments